Muş Province (Armenian: Մուշի մարզ) is a province in eastern Turkey. It is 8,196 km2 in area and has a population of 406,886 according to a 2010 estimate, down from 453,654 in 2000. The provincial capital is the city of Muş. Another town in Muş province, Malazgirt (Manzikert), is famous for the Battle of Manzikert of 1071.

History 
The province is considered part of historical Western Armenia. Before Armenian genocide, the area was part of the Six Armenian Vilayets. The province is considered part of Turkish Kurdistan and has a Kurdish majority. İlker Gündüzöz was appointed Governor of the province by the Recep Tayyip Erdoğan in October 2018.

Districts

Muş province is divided into 6 districts (capital district in bold):
 Bulanık
 Hasköy
 Korkut
 Malazgirt
 Muş
 Varto

Economy

Historically, Muş was known for producing wheat. The province also grew madder, but locals retained it, using it for dye. The area also had salt mines. As of 1920, the region had so much salt that it was said to have enough to supply Europe and Asia.

Notes

External links
 Governor's web site.
 Muş Weather Forecast Information

 
Provinces of Turkey
Turkish Kurdistan